The Mauritanian is a 2021 legal drama film based on the memoir of Mohamedou Ould Slahi, a Mauritanian man who was held for fourteen years (from 2002 to 2016) without charge in the Guantanamo Bay detention camp, a United States military prison. The film was directed by Kevin Macdonald based on a screenplay written by M.B. Traven, Rory Haines, and Sohrab Noshirvani, adapted from Slahi's 2015 memoir Guantánamo Diary. It stars Tahar Rahim as Slahi, and also features Jodie Foster, Shailene Woodley, Benedict Cumberbatch, and Zachary Levi in supporting roles.

The Mauritanian was released in the United States on February 12, 2021 by STXfilms. In the United Kingdom, where all cinemas were closed due to the COVID-19 pandemic, the planned cinema release was cancelled and the film was premiered on Amazon Prime Video on April 1, 2021. It received mixed to positive reviews, with critics praising Macdonald's direction, its cinematography and performances of the cast (particularly of Rahim and Foster) but criticised its screenplay. At the 78th Golden Globe Awards the film received two nominations; Best Actor – Motion Picture Drama (for Rahim), with Foster winning Best Supporting Actress – Motion Picture. At the 74th British Academy Film Awards the film received five nominations, including Best Film, Outstanding British Film, and Best Actor (for Rahim).

Plot
In November 2001, Mohamedou Ould Slahi is in Mauritania, two months after the September 11 attacks. A Mauritanian policeman tells Mohamedou that Americans want to have a talk with him. Mohamedou agrees to go with them.

In Albuquerque, New Mexico, in February 2005, lawyer Nancy Hollander is told by French lawyer Emmanuel that a lawyer from Mauritania approached his firm in Paris on behalf of Mohamedou’s family. They haven’t seen Mohamedou since he was arrested three years ago and only just found out in a newspaper that he is being held by the United States at the Guantanamo Bay detention camp and is accused of being one of the organizers of 9/11. Emmanuel asks Nancy to look into it because she has a security clearance from a previous case and can ask questions he can’t. Nancy agrees to check.

At a Naval Law Conference in New Orleans, Marine Prosecutor Stuart Couch is told by Colonel Bill Seidel about the Mohamedou case which Seidel wants him to prosecute.  Seidel says that Mohamedou fought with Al-Qaeda in the 90s and then recruited for them in Germany, and says it was Mohamedou who recruited the terrorist who flew Stu’s friend’s plane into the tower.

Nancy and Teri (her fellow lawyer) fly down to Guantánamo to meet Mohamedou. Mohamedou agrees to hire them as his lawyers. Meanwhile, Stu tells his team to go through all the intel reports they have to corroborate the story against Mohamedou.

Nancy finds out something through Mohamedou’s letter which she received from him while Stu looks at the MFR (Memorandum for the Record), showing exactly what happened. The letter and reports talk about enhanced torture and treatment including sexual assault upon Mohamedou by the Guantanamo guards as ordered by General Mandel. General Mandel also threatened the arrest and rape of his mother. Thus, to save his mother, Mohamedou gave false confession about being a terrorist.

In December 2009, at trial Mohamedou testified over video link to the court. In March 2010, Mohamedou got a letter informing him that his case was successful, and the judge has ordered him to be released. Text is shown telling us that it would be another 7 years before he actually was released, because the government appealed. His mother died in 2013 so he never saw her again. He was finally released in 2016, having spent 14 years in prison without ever being charged.

Finally, footage of the real Mohamedou arriving back in Mauritania is shown. Texts are shown, telling us Mohamedou lives in Mauritania and got married in 2018 to an American lawyer. They have a baby son, Ahmed, but haven’t been able to live together as a family and are hoping a country will grant them protection and citizenship. Nancy and Teri are still lawyers working against injustice, and we see footage of Mohamedou giving them necklaces with their names in Arabic.

Cast
 Jodie Foster as Nancy Hollander
 Tahar Rahim as Mohamedou Ould Slahi
 Shailene Woodley as Teri Duncan
 Benedict Cumberbatch as Lieutenant Colonel Stuart Couch
 Zachary Levi as Neil Buckland
 Saamer Usmani as Arjun
 Corey Johnson as Bill Seidel
 Denis Menochet as Emmanuel
 David Fynn as Kent
 Walter van Dyk as District Court of Columbia Judge

Production

The film was announced in November 2019. Kevin Macdonald signed on as director, with Benedict Cumberbatch, Jodie Foster, Tahar Rahim and Shailene Woodley cast to star. In December 2019, Zachary Levi joined the cast of the film. Filming began on December 2, 2019 in South Africa.

The film was originally known as Guantánamo Diary in its early development stages, and as Prisoner 760 during production, before being described as untitled in post-production. In November 2020, the title was revealed to be The Mauritanian.

Release
In August 2020, STX Entertainment acquired U.S. distribution rights to the film. STX International will release the film in the United Kingdom and Ireland and pre-sold the international distribution rights at the American Film Market in November 2019. The film was released in the United States on February 12, 2021 in theaters, with a digital demand release following on March 2, 2021.

Reception

Box office 
As of April 1, 2021, the film had made $835,724 domestically and $2,500,000 internationally, for a global total of $3,335,724.

Released alongside Judas and the Black Messiah, Land with limited expansion of Willy's Wonderland on February 12, 2021. The Mauritanian made $163,789 from 245 theaters, and $179,778 over the four-day President's Day weekend. In its second weekend of release the film made $137,072 from 287 theaters. In its third weekend, the film took in $120,192, a decline of 12.3% from the second. In its fourth weekend, the film made $90,004.

Critical response

Review aggregator Rotten Tomatoes reports that 75% of 217 critic reviews were positive, with an average rating of 6.6/10. The website's critics consensus reads: "The Mauritanian takes a frustratingly generic approach to a real-life story that might have been inspirational in other hands, but Tahar Rahim's performance elevates the uneven material." According to Metacritic, which sampled 35 critics and calculated a weighted average score of 53 out of 100, the film received "mixed or average reviews".

Leaf Arbuthnot, writing for Tatler, described the film as 'excellent', praising in particular the performances of Foster and Rahim as 'impeccable'. The Hindu praised the performances of the cast, specifically of Foster, saying; she elevates the legal drama to a whole new level.

Accolades

Notes

References

External links
 
 

2021 drama films
2020s legal drama films
2020s English-language films
2020s French-language films
2020s Arabic-language films
2021 multilingual films
American legal drama films
British drama films
British legal films
BBC Film films
Drama films based on actual events
Films about lawyers
Films based on non-fiction books
Films directed by Kevin Macdonald (director)
Films featuring a Best Supporting Actress Golden Globe-winning performance
Films scored by Max Richter
Films shot in South Africa
Films set in prison
Films set in Cuba
Films set in Mauritania
Films set in New Mexico
Films set in 2001
Films set in 2002
Films set in 2003
Films set in 2005
Films set in 2008
Films set in 2010
Films set in 2016
Films set in the 2000s
Guantanamo Bay detention camp
STX Entertainment films
Topic Studios films
Torture in films
2020s American films
2020s British films